The 1st Surface to Air Missiles Brigade "General Nicolae Dăscălescu", is the main air defense unit of the Romanian Air Force. Its headquarters are located in Bucharest. The brigade was created on August 1, 1973, by gathering together the 18th and 19th SAM regiments. In 1995, it received the honorific name "General Nicolae Dăscălescu" (after Nicolae Dăscălescu 1884-1969) and a new battle flag. The main task of the 1st SAM Brigade is Bucharest's air defense.

The brigade's area of responsibility covers approximately 20,000 square km. in four counties (Giurgiu, Ialomița, Dâmbovița and Călărași). The unit currently operates S-75 M3 "Volhov" missiles. The 7th HAWK Battalion equipped with MIM-23 Hawk missiles was formed in 2006.

Structure
1st SAM Brigade - HQ in Bucharest
1st SAM Battalion "Voievodul Mihai"
2nd SAM Battalion 
3rd SAM Battalion "Codrii Vlăsiei"
4th SAM Battalion "Colonel Mircea Aelenei"
5th SAM Battalion "Horea"
6th SAM Battalion "Șoimii Bărăganului"
7th HAWK Battalion - MIM-23 Hawk
8th Technical Battalion

External links

Official site of the Romanian Air Force

References

Brigades of Romania
Romanian Air Force
Military units and formations established in 1995